Odd Flattum (born 9 August 1942) is a Norwegian sports official and politician for the Labour Party.

He served as a deputy representative to the Norwegian Parliament from Buskerud during the terms 1981–1985 and 1985–1989. Flattum was mayor of Modum from 1991 to 2007.

As a sports official Flattum has been president of the Norwegian Football Association and vice president of the Norwegian Olympic Committee.

References

1942 births
Living people
Deputy members of the Storting
Labour Party (Norway) politicians
Mayors of places in Buskerud
Norwegian sports executives and administrators